Scott Ferrozzo (born April 26, 1965) is a retired American mixed martial artist, who is perhaps best known for his fights in the early days of the Ultimate Fighting Championship. During his fighting career he participated in UFC 8, UFC 11, and UFC 12. Ferrozzo also happened to be managed by current UFC announcer Bruce Buffer.

Career
Ferrozzo first participated in the Ultimate Fighting Championship at its UFC 8 event in 1996. He was offered that fight after video tapes of his participation in the Atlanta Pit Fights. He was defeated by Jerry Bohlander via submission in the first round of the UFC 8 tournament.

Ferrozo returned to the UFC seven months later at UFC 11, defeating Sam Fulton in an alternate bout prior to the start of the pay-per-view broadcast.  By doing so, Ferrozzo secured a spot as an alternate on the card, which meant that if a fighter on the main card was unable to continue to the next round, Ferrozzo would be used as a substitute.  He ended up replacing the man who defeated him at UFC 8, Jerry Bohlander, who was removed from the tournament due to injury.  Ferrozzo stepped in and replaced him against Tank Abbott in the semi-finals.  Ferrozzo was able to score a unanimous decision victory over Abbott to advance to the final round against the reigning UFC Champion Mark Coleman.  However, Ferrozzo was unable to continue after defeating Abbott due to fatigue as well as a cut sustained in his previous bout.  Coleman was declared the UFC 11 champion by way of forfeit.

Ferrozzo's last UFC appearance came at UFC 12 in 1997, participating in the heavyweight tournament.  He defeated Jim Mullen in his first match of the night before losing to Vitor Belfort in the heavyweight finals.  Following the loss to Belfort, Ferrozzo retired from MMA competition. Scott came out of retirement and lost a backyard match to Tank Abbott that went eighteen minutes.  Much of the match was contested with Tank mounting and back mounting Ferrozzo, but unable to do major damage.

Mixed martial arts record

 
|-
|Loss
|align=center|4-2
| Vitor Belfort
| TKO (punches)
| UFC 12
| 
|align=center|1
|align=center|0:43
|Dothan, Alabama, United States
|
|-
|Win
|align=center|4-1
| Jim Mullen
| TKO (punches)
| UFC 12
| 
|align=center|1
|align=center|8:02
|Dothan, Alabama, United States
|
|-
|Win
|align=center|3-1
| Tank Abbott
| Decision (unanimous) 
| UFC 11
| 
|align=center|1
|align=center|15:00
|Augusta, Georgia, United States
| Withdrew from tournament due to fatigue.
|-
|Win
|align=center|2-1
| Sam Fulton
| TKO (submission to punches)
| UFC 11
| 
|align=center|1
|align=center|9:00
|Augusta, Georgia, United States
|
|-
|Win
|align=center|1-1
| Steve Grinnow
| KO (strikes)
| Atlanta Fights
| 
|align=center|1
|align=center|11:58
|Atlanta, Georgia, United States
|
|-
|Loss
|align=center|0-1
| Jerry Bohlander
| Submission (guillotine choke)
| UFC 8
| 
|align=center|1
|align=center|9:03
|San Juan, Puerto Rico
|

See also 
Tank Abbott
Pit Fighting

References

External links

 Scott Ferrozzo - UFC Fans

1965 births
Living people
American male mixed martial artists
Mixed martial artists from Minnesota
People from Crosby, Minnesota
Super heavyweight mixed martial artists
People from Shakopee, Minnesota
Ultimate Fighting Championship male fighters